Yousuf (born August 31, 2001), is a 20-year-old Iraqi who was set on fire by a group of unknown masked men outside of his central Baghdad home on January 15, 2007.

Background
On January 15, 2007, while playing outside his Baghdad home, Yousuf was approached by masked men who proceeded to pour gasoline on him, set him on fire, and flee, leaving then-4-year-old Yousuf to burn. After the attack, Yousuf's father spent nine months trying to obtain medical care in Iraq to treat his son's scarring, without success. Doctors in Iraq told the family that there was little they could do to help and that the family's only option was to seek treatment outside Iraq, an option they simply could not afford.

Eventually, after being told they could help, Yousuf's father visited CNN's Baghdad bureau to ask for advice on how to help his son. In doing so, Yousuf's parents risked their safety. When asked by CNN why they took such a risk, Yousuf's mother, Zainab, responded: "I'd prefer death than seeing my son like this."

In August 2007, CNN's Arwa Damon reported on Yousuf's story on CNN and CNN.com, which resulted in an international outpouring of support for the boy, with thousands across the world expressing willingness to donate to help him and his family. The story went on to become one of the most-read, non-breaking news stories in CNN.com's 12-year history.

No arrests have ever been made in connection with the attack.

Treatment
The California-based Children's Burn Foundation arranged for and agreed to pay for transportation, medical, and housing costs for Yousuf and his family. Dr. Peter Grossman, of the Sherman Oaks Grossman Burn Center, volunteered to perform the necessary surgeries for free. Since a fund was established by CNN and the Children's Burn Foundation, over $300,000 has been donated. When Yousuf's father received the news in Baghdad, he told CNN's Arwa Damon, "I feel like I am going to fly from happiness." Yousuf was also cheered by the news, excitedly running around his house saying, "Daddy, daddy, am I really going to get on a plane?!"

Yousuf, his father, mother, and baby sister arrived in the United States on September 11, 2007. Yousuf's first surgery was performed on September 20, 2007.

Progress and recovery
Since 2007, Yousuf has undergone over twenty surgeries. Yousuf's biggest scar was removed in his second surgery on November 29, 2007. Just before the operation, Yousuf became struck with panic, crying "I can't do this. I can't do this." The surgery, however, was pronounced a success by Dr. Grossman and his team.

Yousuf's second surgery resulted in some short-term complications. Just hours after Yousuf's family began celebrating a successful surgery, they found his bed sheets soaked in blood. Dr. Grossman and his team immediately returned to the operating room and found that the source of the bleeding was an arterial blood vessel, which was brought under control in just thirty minutes. Yousuf, however, was rushed back to the operating room for the third time in twenty-four hours due to further bleeding, this time from an arterial blood vessel on the other side of his face. Dr. Grossman had to re-open Yousuf's stitches—around 60 to 100 of them—to locate the source of the bleeding, a process that lasted almost two hours. By the next day, Yousuf's recovery was back on track. Yousuf's father described his fear when he discovered Yousuf covered in blood, telling CNN, "I said to myself, 'This is it. I'm going to lose my son.'"

The long-term effects of the surgery were highly successful. Two days after the surgery, Yousuf expressed happiness at his progress, proudly announcing "Look, Daddy, my mouth is open! I can fit the whole fork into it and I can take big bites!" he said. On the day he was dispatched from hospital, he said, "I can see all my teeth! I can stick my tongue out all the way!" he said to his dad while waiting to leave the hospital. Dr. Grossman expressed sympathy for Yousuf's parents, saying, "I wish I could have avoided them going through an emotional roller-coaster."

Yousuf began attending an American school in January 2008. He happily pulled off his plastic face mask and patted his cheeks, which were once covered by horrific burns. "No hurt," he said in English on February 26, 2008.

Before his attack, Yousuf told his parents he wished to become a doctor. Yousuf told CNN's Sanjay Gupta that he continues to hold this dream on the August 14, 2010 special edition of Sanjay Gupta MD. When asked why he wanted to be a doctor, Yousuf responded, "to help people". Yousuf's parents continue to support his dream, telling CNN, "We want our son to go places that we couldn't even dream of."

Yousuf's stay in California and his progress throughout his surgeries is being chronicled on a regular basis by CNN.com.  There is also a Facebook page that is dedicated to him entitled "Youssef's Fund" which was put together by Eman Eshmawy and Justin Surmast. As of December 2011, Yousuf and his family are living in Los Angeles and working to obtain US citizenships.

Yousuf is currently in his final year of high school. As of 2020, Yousuf is done with all of his surgeries.

References

External links

Living people
People from Baghdad
Iraqi torture victims
2001 births
Burn survivors